Bergen auf Rügen is an Amt in the district of Vorpommern-Rügen, in Mecklenburg-Vorpommern, Germany. The seat of the Amt is in Bergen auf Rügen.

The Amt Bergen auf Rügen consists of the following municipalities:
Bergen auf Rügen
Buschvitz
Garz/Rügen
Gustow
Lietzow
Parchtitz
Patzig
Poseritz
Ralswiek
Rappin
Sehlen

References

Ämter in Mecklenburg-Western Pomerania
Rügen